The Firecatcher Aircraft F-45 is a single-turboprop aircraft designed for aerial firefighting, air freight and commuter airlines. 
It is financed by UK start-up Arcus Fire, designed by New Zealand firm Flight Structures and built by NZ's Pacific Aerospace.
First flight is planned for 2023 and first delivery for 2024.

Development 

The $4.2 million F-45 is targeted to replace previous designs like the Bombardier CL-215 or the Grumman S-2AT, a market estimated at 1,000 units over 10 to 15 years.
By August 2020, Flight Structures had built the prototype's fuselage, awaiting wings from Pacific Aerospace, as flight testing was planned for 2023 in Hamilton, NZ.
Initial certification is planned under the New Zealand Civil Aviation Authority’s restricted category for a simpler and faster process.
First deliveries are planned from 2024, before cargo and passenger variants.

Design 

Resembling an oversized Cessna Caravan, the Short Take-Off and Landing F-45 is powered by a single Pratt & Whitney Canada PT6-67F.
The air tanker is designed to carry 4,500 litres (1,190 US gal) of water or fire retardant.
The passenger model will have a full stand-up cabin seating 19 people, and will cost $4.5 million like the cargo variant.
It should cruise at speeds up to 190 kn (350 km/h) and have a range of 1,000 nmi (1,852 km) for 45-90 min regional hops.

Specifications

See also

References

External links
 
 

Firecatcher F-45
2020s New Zealand civil utility aircraft
Single-engined tractor aircraft
High-wing aircraft
Single-engined turboprop aircraft
Proposed aircraft
STOL aircraft